The 1914 Princeton Tigers football team represented Princeton University in the 1914 college football season. The team finished with a 5–2–1 record under first-year head coach Wilder Penfield. Princeton tackle Harold Ballin was selected as a consensus first-team honoree on the 1914 College Football All-America Team. This would be Penfield's only season as head coach of the Tigers; he became a neurosurgeon later in life.

Schedule

References

Princeton
Princeton Tigers football seasons
Princeton Tigers football